René Wohler (4 September 1922 – January 2017) was a Swiss basketball player. He competed in the men's tournament at the 1952 Summer Olympics.

References

External links
 

1922 births
2017 deaths
Swiss men's basketball players
Olympic basketball players of Switzerland
Basketball players at the 1952 Summer Olympics
Place of birth missing
Place of death missing